Wigger, or wigga, is a term for a white person of European ethnic origin, who emulates the perceived mannerisms, language, and fashions associated with African-American culture, particularly hip hop. The term is a portmanteau of white and nigger.

One dictionary defines the term as a slang, derogatory reference to "...a white youth who adopts black youth culture by adopting its speech, wearing its clothes, and listening to its music." Another dictionary defines the term as "offensive slang" referring to a "...white person, usually a teenager or young adult, who adopts the fashions, the tastes, and often the mannerisms considered typical of urban black youth."

The term is generally considered derogatory, reflecting stereotypes of African-American, black British, and white culture (when used as a synonym of white trash).  The wannabe connotation may be used pejoratively.  It is also sometimes used in a racist manner by some non-black persons, not only belittling the person perceived as "acting black", but also demeaning black people and culture, by extension.

Phenomenon
The phenomenon of white people adopting stereotypical black mannerisms, speech, music taste, and apparel has appeared in several generations since slavery was abolished in the Western world. The concept has been documented in the United States, Canada, United Kingdom, Australia, and other countries with a significant white population. An early form of this was the white negro in the jazz and swing music scenes of the 1920s and 1930s; as examined in the 1957 Norman Mailer essay The White Negro. It was later seen in the zoot suiter of the 1930s and 1940s, the hipster of the 1940s, the beatnik of the 1950s-1960s, the fascination with Jamaican ska and rude boy culture in Britain's 1960s mod subculture, the blue-eyed soul of the 1970s (soul music sung by white singers), and the hip hop done by white rappers in the 1980s and 1990s.

Bakari Kitwana, "a culture critic who's been tracking American hip hop for years," has written Why White Kids Love Hip Hop: Wankstas, Wiggers, Wannabes, and the New Reality of Race in America. In 1993, an article in the UK newspaper The Independent described the phenomenon of White, middle-class kids who were "wannabe blacks".

The African-American hip hop artist Azealia Banks has criticized white rapper Iggy Azalea "...for failing to comment on 'black issues' despite capitalising on the appropriation of African American culture in her music." Banks has called Azalea a "wigger" and there have been "...accusations of racism against Azalea" focused on her "...insensitivity to the complexities of race relations and cultural appropriation."

Robert A. Clift's documentary, "Blacking Up: Hip-Hop's Remix of Race and Identity," questions white enthusiasts of black hip-hop culture. The term of art wigger "...is used both proudly and derisively to describe white enthusiasts of black hip-hop culture." Clift's documentary examines "...racial and cultural ownership and authenticity -- a path that begins with the stolen blackness seen in the success of Stephen Foster, Al Jolson, Benny Goodman, Elvis Presley, the Rolling Stones—all the way up to Justin Bieber, Vanilla Ice (popular music's ur-wigger) and Eminem."  A review of the documentary refers to the wiggers as "white poseurs."

One of the earliest examples of a wigger is to be found in the fictional character of Felix in Harry Crews' book All We Need of Hell. Felix is the son of white parents who, as the narrative develops, begins to adopt the mannerisms, speech, and sensibilities of a black Southerner athlete he spends time with. Although the book was published in 1987, it was actually written in the 1970s. The character of Ed Wuncler III on the television series The Boondocks is another example of a fictional wigger.

Lawsuit
A 2011 class-action lawsuit in the United States District Court for Minnesota alleged that the administration at a predominantly white high school showed a "deliberate indifference" in allowing a group of students to hold a homecoming event called "Wigger Day" or "Wangsta Day" since at least 2008. A plaintiff named Quera Pruitt sought declaratory judgment and $75,000 in punitive damages from the defendants for creating a racially hostile environment. On July 24, 2012, the parties settled out of court, with Pruitt awarded $90,000.

See also
 Blackface
 Acting white
 Chav 
 Cultural cringe
 Multicultural London English
 Negermusik
 White nigger
 Negrophilia
 Cultural appropriation#African-American culture
 Blackfishing

References

Works cited

External links

 BBC explanation of the term
 "Wigger" by Dutch singer Anouk
 “White White Baby” video Jim Carrey parody of Vanilla Ice's Ice Ice Baby.

1990s slang
2000s slang
African-American culture
American slang
Class-related slurs
Cultural appropriation
English words
Pejorative terms for European people
 Wigger
Social groups
Stereotypes of white people
Socioeconomic stereotypes